Aleya Hamrouni (born 12 December 1945) is a Tunisian handball player. He competed in the men's tournament at the 1972 Summer Olympics. With the national team, he won the African Cup in 1974, which was the first edition of the tournament. In the domestic league he played for Club Africain (handball) and won multiple Tunisian league and cup titles.

Honors

With Club Africain 
 Tunisian Handball League (3) 
 Champion: 1965, 1968, 1970

 Tunisian Cup (6)
 Winner: 1964, 1965, 1966, 1967, 1968, 1969

National team 
 African Men's Handball Championship (1)
 Sieger: 1974

References

1945 births
Living people
Tunisian male handball players
Olympic handball players of Tunisia
Handball players at the 1972 Summer Olympics
Place of birth missing (living people)